Vivahasammanam is a 1971 Indian Malayalam-language film, directed by J. D. Thottan. The film stars Prem Nazir, Sheela, Kaviyoor Ponnamma and Adoor Bhasi. The film had musical score by G. Devarajan.

Cast

Prem Nazir as Kannankutty Nair
Sheela as Gourikkutty
Kaviyoor Ponnamma as Parukuttyamma 
Adoor Bhasi as Kunjiraman Nair
Thikkurissy Sukumaran Nair as Thahasildar
Prema as Thahasildar's wife
T. S. Muthaiah as Panikker
Alummoodan as Achuthan
K. P. Ummer as Madhavankutty
Meena as Madhavi
Rani Chandra as Sundari
Sadhana as Meenakshi
T. K. Balachandran as Velukutty Nair
Muthukulam as Valyammavan
Vanchiyoor Radha as Cheriyamma
P. R. Menon as Raman Nair

Soundtrack
The music was composed by G. Devarajan and the lyrics were written by Vayalar Ramavarma.

References

External links
 

1971 films
1970s Malayalam-language films
Films directed by J. D. Thottan